Sychnomerus is a genus of beetles in the family Cerambycidae, containing the following species:

 Sychnomerus barbiger Bates, 1885
 Sychnomerus hirticornis Bates, 1885

References

Acanthoderini